The 2016 Open Città della Disfida was a professional tennis tournament played on clay courts. It was the 17th edition of the tournament which was part of the 2016 ATP Challenger Tour. It took place in Barletta, Italy between 11 and 17 April 2016.

Singles main-draw entrants

Seeds

 1 Rankings are as of April 4, 2016.

Other entrants
The following players received wildcards into the singles main draw:
  Julien Benneteau
  Edoardo Eremin
  Federico Gaio
  Gianluca Mager

The following player received entry into the singles main draw with a protected ranking:
  Julian Reister

The following players received entry from the qualifying draw:
  Enrique López Pérez
  Dimitar Kuzmanov
  Lorenzo Sonego
  Peter Torebko

The following player received entry as a lucky loser:
  Alexey Vatutin

Champions

Singles

  Elias Ymer def.  Adam Pavlásek, 7–5, 6–4

Doubles

  Johan Brunström /  Andreas Siljeström def.  Flavio Cipolla /  Rogério Dutra Silva, 0–6, 6–4, [10–8]

External links
Official Website
ITF Search
ATP official site

Open Citta Della Disfida
Open Città della Disfida